Eleven United States presidents and three presidents-elect have made thirty-four presidential visits to Central America. The first visit by an incumbent president to a country in Central America was made in 1906 by Theodore Roosevelt. The trip, to Panama, was the first international presidential trip in U.S. history, and signaled the start of a new era in how presidents conducted diplomatic relations with other countries. In 1928, Herbert Hoover, during the time when he was president-elect, visited the region during his historic "good will" trip, to Central and South America.

The number of visits made to each country in the region are: 12 to Panama, seven to Costa Rica, five to El Salvador, four to Honduras, three to Guatemala, and three to Nicaragua. Only Belize has not been visited by an American president.

Table of visits

See also
 Latin America–United States relations
 Foreign relations of the United States

References

Costa Rica–United States relations
El Salvador–United States relations
Guatemala–United States relations
Honduras–United States relations
Nicaragua–United States relations
Panama–United States relations
Lists of United States presidential visits